Eucalyptus transcontinentalis, commonly known as redwood or boongul, is a species of small to medium-sized tree, sometimes a mallet, that is endemic to the southwest of Western Australia. It has smooth bark, lance-shaped adult leaves, flower buds usually in groups of seven, pale yellow flowers and urn-shaped to barrel-shaped fruit.

Description
Eucalyptus transcontinentalis is a tree, sometimes a  mallet, that typically grows to a height of  but does not form a lignotuber. It has smooth white or greyish bark with occasional pale grey-yellow or pink blotches. Flowering occurs between July and December and the flowers are pale yellow.

Taxonomy and naming
Eucalyptus transcontinentalis was first formally described in 1919 by Joseph Maiden in the Journal and Proceedings of the Royal Society of New South Wales from specimens he had collected from near Kalgoorlie in 1909.

Maiden considered that Eucalyptus oleosa var. glauca Maiden and Eucalyptus uncinata var. rostrata Benth. are synonyms and that the range of E. transcontinentalis, extended into South Australia, Victoria and New South Wales.

The tree has been referred to as Goldfields Redwood, a reference to the mining operations in its habitat.

Distribution and habitat
Redwood is found on flats and low rises on red sandy loam in open forest and woodland in the southern and central goldfields from the Frank Hann National Park near Salmon Gums, east to near Norseman and north to near Menzies.

Conservation status
This eucalypt is classified as "not threatened" by the Western Australian Government Department of Parks and Wildlife.

See also
List of Eucalyptus species

References

transcontinentalis
Endemic flora of Western Australia
Mallees (habit)
Myrtales of Australia
Eucalypts of Western Australia
Trees of Australia
Plants described in 1919
Taxa named by Joseph Maiden